Sainte-Gemmes-d'Andigné (literally Sainte-Gemmes- of Andigné) is a former commune in the Maine-et-Loire department in western France. On 15 December 2016, it was merged into the new commune Segré-en-Anjou Bleu. Its population was 1,429 in 2019.

Geography
The river Oudon forms part of the commune's north-eastern border. The village lies on the right bank of the Verzée, which flows east-northeastward through the commune.

See also
Communes of the Maine-et-Loire department

References

Saintegemmesdandigne